Kauklahti railway station is a station on the Helsinki commuter rail network located in Espoo, Finland. The station is served by Helsinki commuter rail lines Y, X, U, L and E. The station has three platform tracks. Westbound trains towards Kirkkonummi use track one, while eastbound trains to Helsinki use track two. Some of the E-line trains however use track three.

There used to be a request stop called Pelto whistle stop on the eastbound line towards Espoo and Helsinki, but this stop was closed in 1995 due to lack of use. There also used to be a little halt, Mankki, on the westbound line towards Kirkkonummi. This halt was closed in 2016 due to low passenger amounts.

Connections 
 Y-line trains (Helsinki-Siuntio-Helsinki)
 U-line trains (Helsinki-Kirkkonummi-Helsinki)
 L-line trains (Helsinki-Kirkkonummi-Helsinki, nighttime)
 E-line trains (Helsinki-Kauklahti-Helsinki)

External links

References 

Railway stations in Espoo